Warren is an unincorporated community in Carbon County, Montana, United States at , elevation . It is situated on Montana Secondary Highway 310.

History

Warren started as an agricultural town north of the Montana–Wyoming border. Today, Warren relies on a large limestone quarry and processing industry. A post office operated in Warren from 1911 to 1953. A majority of the original town structures no longer exist; however, a number of modern buildings and residences are in and around the Warren area.

References

Unincorporated communities in Carbon County, Montana
Unincorporated communities in Montana